Anwar Hossain (6 October 1948 – 1 December 2018) was a Bangladeshi photographer and cinematographer. He won Bangladesh National Film Award for Best Cinematography a record five times for the films Sundori (1979), Emiler Goenda Bahini (1980), Puraskar (1983), Anya Jibon (1995) and Lalsalu (2003).

Early life and education 
Hossain was born in Old Dhaka in 1948. He completed his SSC from Armanitola Government High School and HSC from  Notre Dame College, Dhaka in 1965 and 1967 respectively. He graduated in architecture from BUET and a diploma in cinematography from the Film and Television Institute of Pune, India.

Career
Hossain started his photography career in 1967. His photography captured the Liberation War of Bangladesh.

Hossain worked as a cinematographer of total 15 fictions and 30 documentary films.

Personal life and death
Hossain married to Bangladeshi film actress and writer Dolly Anwar in 1979. Anwar committed suicide on 3 July 1991. Hossain migrated to France after the death of his first wife in 1991. In 1993, he married a French woman and had two sons together.

Hossain was found dead in the Olio Dream Haven hotel in Panthapath area in Dhaka on 1 December 2018. He had been staying at this hotel as he was serving as a judge for a local photography competition.

Films
 Surja Dighal Bari (La Maison Tragique), 1979
 Emiler Goenda Bahini, 1980
 Bostrobalikara: Garment Girls of Bangladesh (TV documentary) 
 Dahan 1985
 Anya Jibon 1995
 Nadir Naam Madhumati (A River Named Madhumati), 1994
 Chitra Nodir Pare (Quiet Flows the River Chitra), 1999
 Lalsalu, 2002
 Shyamol Chhaya, 2004
 Three Beauties (producer), 2006
 Swapnabhumi: The Promised Land, 2007

Awards and honors
 
 Sole Jury, Commonwealth photo contest, Cyprus, 1980
 Principal National Jury, Bangladesh, 2008–2011

References

External links
 
 

1948 births
2018 deaths
People from Dhaka
Bangladesh University of Engineering and Technology alumni
Bangladeshi photographers
Bangladeshi cinematographers
Best Cinematographer National Film Award (Bangladesh) winners
Notre Dame College, Dhaka alumni